Will Brown may refer to:

Will Brown, central figure in the Omaha race riot of 1919
Will Brown (basketball) (born 1971), head men's basketball coach at the University at Albany
Will Brown (sport shooter) (born 1991), American sport shooter
Will Brown (racing driver) (born 1998), Australian racing driver

See also
Willie Brown (disambiguation)
William Brown (disambiguation)
Bill Brown (disambiguation)
Billy Brown (disambiguation)